Lakeview is a populated place situated in Coconino County, Arizona, United States, south of Mormon Lake.

Although at times confused with the neighboring community of Mormon Lake, a 1966 Board on Geographic Names decision clarified that they are distinct communities. However, as Mormon Lake has a post office, while Lakeview does not, Lakeview residents have a Mormon Lake address.

References

Populated places in Coconino County, Arizona